Uncharacterized LOC440896 is a protein that in humans is encoded by the LOC440896 gene.

References

Further reading